The Men's 2015 European Amateur Boxing Championships were held in Samokov, Bulgaria from August 8 to August 15. It is the 41st edition of this biennial competition organised by the European governing body for amateur boxing, the EUBC.

44 nations took part in the competition, including Great Britain, who entered a united team for the first time - previously the constituent nations of England, Scotland and Wales each entered separately. Russia topped the medal table with 4 golds from 4 finals, while the unified British team won the most medals, 6, and reached the most finals, 5, although winning only 1 gold medal.

Schedule

Medal winners 
The medal winners are:

Medal table

Below is the final medal table from the championships. The table is led by Russia, with four gold medals. Great Britain, with six medals, won the most medals in total.

Qualification for the World Championships

The event doubled as the second European qualification event for the World Championships, and the top six in each division qualified a quota place for their nation - in effect, all four medalists, and the following quarter-finalists, who were listed 5th and 6th by virtue of having been beaten by the eventual finalists.

49 kg
 
 

52 kg
 
 

56 kg
 
 

60 kg
 
 

64 kg
 
 

69 kg
 
 

75 kg
 
 

81 kg
 
 

91 kg
 
 

+91 kg

References

European Amateur Boxing Championships
European Amateur Boxing Championships
2015 European Amateur Boxing Championships
2015 in Bulgarian sport
International boxing competitions hosted by Bulgaria
Samokov